Justice Stephens may refer to:

Debra L. Stephens (born 1965), associate justice of the Washington Supreme Court
Kenneth C. Stephan (born 1946), associate justice of the Nebraska Supreme Court
Linton Stephens (1823–1872), associate justice of the Supreme Court of Georgia
Robert F. Stephens (1927–2002), associate justice and chief justice of the Kentucky Supreme Court
William Stephens (judge) (1752–1819), chief justice of the Supreme Court of Georgia

See also
John Stephen (Maryland judge) (1780–1844), associate justice of the Maryland Court of Appeals
Judge Stephens (disambiguation)
Justice Stevens (disambiguation)